Jackson/Euclid station is a light rail station in Salt Lake City, Utah serviced by the Green Line of the Utah Transit Authority's (UTA) TRAX system. The Green Line provides service from the Salt Lake City International Airport to West Valley City (via Downtown Salt Lake City and connects with the rest of the TRAX system, as well as UTA's FrontRunner commuter rail and S Line streetcar.

Description 
The station is located at 820 West North Temple Street, with the island platform in the median of the street. Unlike many TRAX stations, Jackson/Euclid does not have a Park and Ride lot. Like many other UTA stations, this station has art work included in its design. The art work for the Jackson/Euclid station is murals that include a colorful collection of images that reflect the vibrant neighborhoods along the Airport TRAX Line. The set of murals is called Comunidades en Solidaridad: A Collective Transformative Vision and was designed by Ruby Chacon of Salt Lake City. The station is part of a railway right of way that was created specifically for the Green Line. The station opened on 14 April 2013 and is operated by the Utah Transit Authority. It is also one of four TRAX stations (all of which are located the north end of the Green Line) that is powered by solar panels located on top of the station's canopy through a project which was initially funded in part by Rocky Mountain Power.

References 

TRAX (light rail) stations
Railway stations in the United States opened in 2013
Railway stations in Salt Lake City
2013 establishments in Utah